Deer Park/Vineland Road is a local service district in the Canadian province of Newfoundland and Labrador.

Government 
Deer Park/Vineland Road is a local service district (LSD) that is governed by a committee responsible for the provision of certain services to the community. The chair of the LSD committee is Dave Chaulk.

See also 
List of communities in Newfoundland and Labrador
List of local service districts in Newfoundland and Labrador

References

External links 

Local service districts in Newfoundland and Labrador